PhDiA is an organization established to provide a forum for discussion of issues related to the education of doctoral students in architecture. Membership includes leading voices in academia, the profession and doctoral students.
PhDiA also sponsors a peer-reviewed journal and supports regular conferences.

Mission

PhDiA was created to:

Establish a clearinghouse for doctoral program pedagogy and structure
Assist faculty and administrators in doctoral programs
Provide a forum for doctoral students
Encourage inter-university doctoral research and dissertation cooperation
Elevate doctoral studies and the role of research and advanced scholarship
Recognize outstanding achievements and leadership in doctoral research

References 

Architectural education